Mark Gottlieb (born December 11, 1956) is an American civil engineer who served as a Republican Party member of the Wisconsin State Assembly, representing the 60th Assembly District and was Secretary of the Department of Transportation from 2011-2017.

Background 
Born in Milwaukee on December 11, 1956, Gottlieb graduated from James Madison High School (Milwaukee) in 1974, then served in the United States Navy from 1974-78. He earned B.S. (1981) and Master of Engineering (1984) degrees from the University of Wisconsin–Milwaukee, and became a civil engineer.

Public office 
Gottlieb served on the Port Washington Common Council 1991-1997 and then as mayor of Port Washington, Wisconsin from 1997-2003, and was first elected to the Assembly in 2002. He was elected Speaker Pro Tempore for the 2007-2008 legislative session.

When the Democratic Party took control of the Assembly after the 2008 elections, Gottlieb was elected Assistant Republican Leader for the 2009-2010 session.

In the 2009-2010 session, Gottlieb was the ranking member of the Joint Survey Committee on Retirement Systems and a member of the Joint Committee on Legislative Organization. He also served on the following Assembly committees: Rules, Urban and Local Affairs, and Colleges and Universities.

On December 30, 2010, Governor-elect Scott Walker announced that Gottlieb would serve in his cabinet as Secretary of the Department of Transportation. Gottlieb resigned from the Assembly on January 3, 2011 to assume that position. On December 27, 2016, it was announced that Gottlieb was resigning, which took effect on January 6, 2017. He was replaced by Dave Ross.

References

External links
Mark Gottlieb, Wisconsin Historical Society

1956 births
American civil engineers
Living people
State cabinet secretaries of Wisconsin
Wisconsin city council members
Mayors of places in Wisconsin
Republican Party members of the Wisconsin State Assembly
Politicians from Milwaukee
University of Wisconsin–Milwaukee alumni
21st-century American politicians
People from Port Washington, Wisconsin